Lea DeLaria (born May 23, 1958) is an American comedian, actress, and jazz singer. DeLaria is credited with being the first openly gay comic to appear on American television with her 1993 appearance on The Arsenio Hall Show. She is best known for her portrayal of inmate Carrie "Big Boo" Black on Netflix original series Orange Is the New Black (2013-2019). She's known for her work on Broadway including the revival of The Rocky Horror Show in 2000, and POTUS: Or, Behind Every Great Dumbass Are Seven Women Trying to Keep Him Alive in 2022.

Early life
DeLaria was born in Belleville, Illinois, the daughter of Jerry Jean (née Cox), a homemaker, and Robert George DeLaria, a jazz pianist and social worker. Her paternal grandparents were Italian.  She attended kindergarten through eighth grade at St. Mary's Elementary School in Belleville and has referenced her Catholic upbringing in her performances.

Career

DeLaria's stand-up career began in 1982 when she moved to San Francisco and performed raunchy stand-up comedy in the Mission District. Discussing her stand-up, Delaria says, "This is who I am, when I'm up there. This is it. I'm a big butch dyke. That's who I am. And I'm a friendly one. I'm a big butch dyke with a smile on my face."

In 1986, DeLaria directed "Ten Percent Revue", a musical revue with songs related to homosexuality and most of which reflect pride in being gay. "Ten Percent Revue" was performed in Boston, San Francisco, Provincetown, Philadelphia, and Atlanta. Many shows were sold out.

In 1988, DeLaria starred in "Dos Lesbos", a musical comedy about two lesbians dealing with the issues of living together. The show received very favorable reviews nationwide.

DeLaria starred in "Girl Friday: We're Funny That Way", a musical comedy, in 1989.

When DeLaria appeared on The Arsenio Hall Show in 1993, she was the first openly gay comic to appear on a late-night talk show. While appearing on the show, DeLaria said, "Hello everybody, my name is Lea DeLaria, and it's great to be here, because it's the 1990s! It's hip to be queer! I'm a big dyke." DeLaria later said she had been told that she should not have used the term dyke on the air. Hall later defended her, saying, "If she wants to call herself a dyke, that's her business."

In December 1993, DeLaria hosted Comedy Central's Out There, the first all-gay stand-up comedy special.

DeLaria is also known for her touring "musical comedy about perverts", Dos Lesbos (1987–1989), as well as Girl Friday, a comedy she conceived, wrote, directed and starred in, and which won the 1989 Golden Gull for Best Comedy Group in Provincetown, Massachusetts.

DeLaria has released two CD recordings of her comedy, Bulldyke in a China Shop (1994) and Box Lunch (1997). She has also written a humorous book entitled Lea's Book of Rules for the World.

DeLaria appeared as Jane in the 1998 Off Broadway production of Paul Rudnick's The Most Fabulous Story Ever Told, "a gay retelling of the Bible." Entertainment Weekly said "a star is born with Lea DeLaria" of her "showstopping" performance as Hildy Esterhazy in the 1998 Broadway revival of On the Town.

DeLaria subsequently played Eddie and Dr. Scott in the 2000 Broadway revival of The Rocky Horror Show, and can be heard on the cast recording. DeLaria appeared in a number of films, including Edge of Seventeen and The First Wives Club.

DeLaria integrates musical performance into her stand-up comedy, focusing on traditional and modern be-bop jazz. In 2001 she released a CD of jazz standards called Play It Cool. This was followed by the album Double Standards in 2003, and by The Very Best of Lea DeLaria in 2008.

In 2001, DeLaria was the voice of Helga Phugly on the short-lived animated sitcom The Oblongs. In 1996 DeLaria played the part of a woman friend of Carol and Susan in the Friends episode The One with the Lesbian Wedding.  In 1999 DeLaria played the recurring role of Madame Delphina on the ABC soap opera One Life to Live, returning in 2008 as both Delphina and Professor Delbert Fina. She continued to portray Delphina on a recurring basis until 2011.

In 2008, Warner Records released The Live Smoke Sessions, DeLaria's first recording focused on "timeless pop standards" such as "Down With Love," "Night and Day," "Love Me or Leave Me" and "Come Rain or Come Shine." She noted, "I styled this CD on the old school live recordings ... It is my hope that this CD will take you back to 1948 and the Village Vanguard. So please let me invite you to mix a cocktail and enjoy a smoke while you sit back and soak up the swing."

In November 2008, DeLaria completed a tour of Australia, playing Sydney, Melbourne, Adelaide and Brisbane. She also frequently collaborates with comedian Maggie Cassella, most notably on an annual Christmas cabaret show in Toronto, Ontario which also sometimes tours to several other North American cities. In July 2010, her version of "All That Jazz" was used on So You Think You Can Dance. DeLaria performed in Prometheus Bound at the American Repertory Theater in Cambridge, Massachusetts. Since 2013, she has appeared in the Netflix Original Orange Is the New Black as the recurring character prison inmate Carrie 'Big Boo' Black.

In December 2014, DeLaria voiced EJ Randell, the lesbian mother of Jeff in the Cartoon Network animated series Clarence.

On February 14, 2015, DeLaria received the Equality Illinois Freedom Award for her work as "a cutting-edge performer who has used her talent to entertain and enlighten millions of Americans," said Bernard Cherkasov, CEO of Equality Illinois. On receiving the award at the 2015 Equality Illinois Gala in Chicago, DeLaria said, "As an out performer for over 33 years who has made it her life's work to change peoples perception of butch, queer and LGBT, it is an honor for me to receive such recognition from my home state. I feel I'm doing Belleville proud. Go Maroons!".

In 2017, DeLaria revealed about what went wrong with the butch lesbian stereotypes just because she herself is an androgynous masculine-presenting lesbian.

In 2022, DeLaria returned to Broadway in the comic play POTUS: Or, Behind Every Great Dumbass Are Seven Women Trying to Keep Him Alive where she received positive acclaim from critics.

The U-Haul Joke 
DeLaria is the originator of the U-Haul Joke (see also U-Haul lesbian) which she began performing at comedy shows in 1989.

Question: "What does a lesbian bring on a second date?"

Answer: "A U-Haul."

Personal life
In January 2015, DeLaria became engaged to fashion editor Chelsea Fairless after two and a half years of dating. The two met through Fairless's friend, actress Emma Myles, who plays Leanne in Orange is the New Black. In January 2017, DeLaria confirmed she and Fairless had separated.

Discography

Comedy albums
 1992: Bulldyke in a Chinashop
 1997: Box Lunch (Rising Star)

Jazz albums
 2001: Play It Cool (Warner/WEA)
 2005: Double Standards (Telarc)
 2006: The Very Best of Lea DeLaria (Rhino/WEA UK)
 2008: Lea DeLaria – The Live Smoke Sessions (Ghostlight Records)
 2015: House of David (Ghostlight Records)

Guest vocalist
 2005: Din and Tonic – Janette Mason (Fireball Records)
 2006: Drawn to All Things – Ian Shaw Sings the Songs of Joni Mitchell – Ian Shaw  (Linn Records)
 2009: Alien Left Hand – Janette Mason  (Fireball Records)

Theatre and film
 1998: On the Town – Broadway Revival Cast – as Hildy Esterhazy
 1999: Edge of Seventeen – Music from the Motion Picture Soundtrack – Blue Skies (Razor and Tie)
 2001: The Rocky Horror Show – 2000 Broadway Revival Cast (RCA Victor Broadway) – as Dr. Scott/Eddie
 2005: Hair – Actors' Fund of America Benefit Recording (Ghostlight)
 2017: Cars 3 – "Freeway of Love"
 2017: Mamma Mia! - Hollywood Bowl – as Rosie
 2022: POTUS: Or, Behind Every Great Dumbass Are Seven Women Trying to Keep Him Alive - Shubert Theatre – as Bernadette

Filmography

Film

Television

Theatre

Video games

Podcasts

Awards and nominations

References

External links

 
 
 
 

1958 births
American women comedians
American women jazz singers
American film actresses
American jazz singers
American musical theatre actresses
American people of Italian descent
People of Sicilian descent
American stage actresses
American television actresses
American voice actresses
Female-to-male cross-dressers
Jazz musicians from Illinois
Lesbian comedians
American lesbian musicians
American lesbian actresses
Living people
Theatre World Award winners
People from Belleville, Illinois
Actresses from Illinois
LGBT people from Illinois
Comedians from Illinois
Warner Records artists
Singers from Illinois
20th-century American actresses
21st-century American actresses
20th-century American comedians
21st-century American comedians
20th-century American singers
21st-century American singers
20th-century American women singers
21st-century American women singers
20th-century American LGBT people
21st-century American LGBT people
American LGBT comedians